The Holy Cross College of Sasa is a private Catholic, secondary and tertiary education institution run by the Teresian Daughters of Mary in Davao City, Philippines under the auspices of the Roman Catholic Archdiocese of Davao. It was founded by the Society of Foreign Missions (P.M.E.) in 1966.

History
The institution was established as the Holy Cross Academy of Sasa by the Society of Foreign Missions (P.M.E.)  It was renamed the Holy Cross College of Sasa in 1966, when it began offering college courses.

Accreditation
This is a CHED Certified Higher Education Institution. They are members of the Philippine Society of IT Educators. The PAASCU Accreditation is now under process.

Under Graduate Programs
The Holy Cross College of Sasa, Inc is offering the following courses:

Bachelor of Science in Hotel and Restaurant Management
Bachelor of Science in Tourism
Bachelor of Science in Business Administration
Financial Management

Bachelor of Science in Information Technology
Bachelor of Science in Secondary Education
Filipino
English
Mathematics

References

External links
 Facebook page

Catholic universities and colleges in the Philippines
Catholic secondary schools in the Philippines
Universities and colleges in Davao City
Schools in Davao City
Educational institutions established in 2010
2010 establishments in the Philippines